Sambo, for the 2013 World Combat Games, took place at the Spartak Sport Complex in Saint Petersburg, Russia, on the 18 and 19 October 2013.

Medal table
Key:

Medal summary

Men

Women

References

Sambo at multi-sport events
2013 World Combat Games events
2013 in sambo (martial art)